"Ari Belema" is a song by Nigerian singer-songwriter Tonye Garrick, released off her forthcoming album. Translated to "I Love You" in English, "Ari Belema" was produced by Orbeat and released through Dahlia Entertainment on 18 February 2015.

Background
"Ari Belema" was released in celebration of Valentine's Day. The wedding-themed lyrics depicts the joy and happiness of a bride who is about to be married. The music video for the song was directed by Wale Davies and released on August 27, 2015.

Release history

Audio release history

Music video release history

Personnel

Song credits
Writing - Tonye Garrick, Ada Edolo
Production - Orbeat
Video credits 
Director - Wale Davies

References

External links

Tonye Garrick songs
2015 songs